Richard Essien known professionally as Magical Bones is a UK-based magician, illusionist and Bboy. His back flip card trick is celebrated.

Career
He started his career as a dancer with Madonna, The Black Eyed Peas, Alicia Keys, and Plan B.

He starred in the music video for Mint Royale's "Singin' in the Rain".

He performed around the world including for Madonna's son's 10th birthday party.

He performed the back flip card trick at 1000 ft up  at the Shard.

TV appearances

In 2015 he starred in Sky's Around the World in 80 Tricks.

He appeared twice on This Morning and wowed Holly Willoughby and Philip Schofield with his magic.

He was a finalist in series 14 of Britain's Got Talent in 2020. He related the story of Henry Box Brown.

He featured alongside Penn & Teller in their show Penn & Teller:Fool Us Season 7 EP 27.

He appeared on Pure Magic and Crackerjack on the BBC.

He appeared on Sky's magazine style show about arts and culture; Unmuted.

He was the runner up for the ITV Christmas Special BGT: Ultimate Magician in December 2022

Theatre

Bones was cast as one of the six magicians to feature in the West End magic show Impossible, which debuted at the Noel Coward Theatre and then went on to tour around the U.K and globally in Dubai, Lebanon, and the Philippines.

Bones’ debut solo show Black Magic sold out residencies at London’s Southbank Festival and the Edinburgh Fringe Festival and went on to play around the UK.

His second show Soulful Magic premiered at Fringe 2022 and was slated for a nationwide tour in the spring of 2023.

In 2022 he was at the Fringe alongside his sister, comedian Eme Essien.

References 

Living people
British magicians
British television personalities
Year of birth missing (living people)
Britain's Got Talent contestants
British male dancers
British breakdancers